Nash & Thompson was a British engineering firm that developed and produced hydraulically operated gun turrets for aircraft. As part of Parnall Aircraft it was also an important manufacturer of hydraulic-powered radar scanners used on radar systems such as H2S and AI Mark VIII.

Nash & Thompson also designed the hydraulically-powered turret traversing systems that were used in British Cruiser tanks from the A9 - the first tank with a powered turret traverse - through to the Cromwell.

History 
Nash & Thompson was established in 1929 at Kingston upon Thames by business partners Archibald Goodman Frazer Nash and Esmonde Grattan Thompson

Nash & Thompson developed the hydraulic gun turrets that Frazer-Nash invented and his designs were consequently numbered in a series prefixed with "FN".

Parnall Aircraft
In May 1935 they formed Parnall Aircraft taking over George Parnall & Company and Hendy Aircraft Company. Thompson was appointed managing director and Frazer Nash technical director.

The company's major competition in the UK was from Boulton & Paul, which had licensed the designs of the French company S.A.M.M. (Societe d'Application des Machines Motrices). The FN turrets used hydraulic power produced by the aircraft's engine: the BP designs used individual hydraulic pumps for each turret supplied from the aircraft's 24-volt electrical system.

Products 

Nash & Thompson built a wide range of turrets for aircraft. All were powered hydraulically and carried 0.303-inch (7.7 mm) Vickers K or Browning machine guns, except where noted. Many were built by Parnall Aircraft with which they merged in 1935.

 FN-1 – "lobster back" partially enclosed turret for Hawker Demon
 FN-4A – four-gun rear turret
 FN-5 – two-gun nose turret on Avro Manchester, Short Stirling and Vickers Wellington
 FN-5A – two-gun nose turret on Avro Lancaster
 FN-7 – two-gun dorsal turret on Blackburn Botha, Manchester, Short Sunderland, Stirling
 FN-9 – two-gun retractable "dustbin" ventral turret on Wellington, rarely fitted.
 FN-10 – two-gun tail turret on early-model Wellington and Armstrong Whitworth Whitley
 FN-11 – two-gun retractable nose turret in Sunderland
 FN-13 – four-gun tail turret in Sunderland
 FN-16 – single Vickers 'K' gun front turret in Whitley
 FN-17 – two-gun retractable "dustbin" ventral turret on Whitley, rarely used
 FN-20 – four-gun tail turret on Lancaster, Wellington, Stirling and Whitley
 FN-21A – two-gun retractable "dustbin" ventral turret on Manchester, rarely used
 FN-25 – two-gun retractable "dustbin" ventral turret for the Wellington I based on the FN-17
 FN-50 – two-gun dorsal turret ("Centre Gun Turret") on Lancaster, late-model Stirling
 FN-51 – two-gun dorsal turret on early-model Handley Page Halifax
 FN-54 – two-gun rearward firing chin turret on Bristol Blenheim Mk.IV and Bristol Beaufort
 FN-64 – two-gun ventral turret ("Under Gun Turret") on Lancaster with periscopic sight, rarely fitted
 FN-77 – retractable ventral turret fitted with Leigh Light for the Wellington and Warwick based on the FN-25
 FN-82 – two-gun (0.5 inch (12.7 mm) Browning) tail turret on late-model Lancaster
 FN-120 – four-gun tail turret; refinement of the FN-20 weighing  less; used on late-model Lancaster and Wellington
 FN-121 – four-gun tail turret on late-model Lancaster fitted with Village Inn gun-laying radar; also used without AGLR on Wellington and Warwick
 FN-150 – an improved two-gun dorsal turret, based on the FN-50, and fitted to many Lancasters

See also
 Rose turret

Note

References
Notes

Bibliography

 Tarring, Trevor and Mark Joseland. Archie Frazer-Nash ... Engineer. London: The Frazer Nash Archives, 2011. .

External links 
 Gun turrets including FN types
 
 "Power-Operated Gun Turrets" a 1940 Flight article by A. Frazer-Nash

Companies based in the Royal Borough of Kingston upon Thames
Defunct aircraft manufacturers of the United Kingdom
Manufacturing companies established in 1929
Weapon turrets